Browne Sugar is the debut album  by Tom Browne.  It was released in 1979 on the GRP Records and reached number six on the Jazz Album chart in 1979.

Track listing
"Throw Down" (Tom Browne) – 3:56  	   	
"I Never Was a Cowboy" (Dave Grusin) – 4:24 		
"Herbal Scent" (Marcus Miller) – 5:22		
"Brother, Brother" (Marcus Miller) – 5:36		
"The Closer I Get to You" (James Mtume, Reggie Lucas) – 4:38 		
"What's Going On" (Marvin Gaye, Renaldo Benson, Al Cleveland) – 5:13		
"Promises For Spring" (Tom Browne) – 4:50	    		
"Antoinette Like" (Bernard Wright) – 3:40

Personnel 
Tom Browne - trumpet, flugelhorn
Dave Grusin - Oberheim synthesizer, electric piano, Clavinet, mini-Moog synthesizer, percussion
Bernard Wright - acoustic and electric piano
Rob Mounsey - Oberheim synthesizer
Buddy Williams - drums
Errol "Crusher" Bennett - percussion, congas
Sue Evans - percussion, congas
Ron Dean Miller - guitar
Marcus Miller, Francisco Centeno - bass
Michael Brecker - tenor saxophone
Frank Floyd, Patti Austin, Vivian Cherry, Zachary Sanders - vocals

Charts

Trivia

The song "Throw Down" can be heard in the video game Grand Theft Auto V on the radio station Worldwide FM.

References

External links
 Tom Browne-Browne Sugar at Discogs

1979 debut albums
Tom Browne (trumpeter) albums
GRP Records albums
Albums produced by Dave Grusin